The GP100 is a family/line of double action five- (.44 Special), six- (.357 Magnum, .38 Special, & 10mm Auto), seven- (.357 Magnum and .327 Federal Magnum), or ten-shot (.22 Long Rifle) revolvers made by Sturm, Ruger & Co., manufactured in the United States. Since its introduction, it has been produced with a number of variations including various barrel lengths and profiles, fixed or adjustable sights, and in blued carbon steel or stainless steel.

Description and features
The GP100 was an evolution of an earlier Ruger double-action revolver, the Security Six. It was introduced in 1985 as a second generation of the Ruger double-action, exposed-hammer revolvers intended to replace Ruger's Security-/Service-/Speed-Six line. It was made stronger with the intent to fire an unlimited number of full-power .357 Magnum rounds. The first significant change was introduced with the Ruger Redhawk and that involved a new locking mechanism with a lever on the crane rather than using the end of the ejector rod to lock.

Another change was the shape of the frame. Traditional revolver frames had exposed metal at the front and rear of the grips, with the frame determining the shape of the grips. This meant that to have a round butt concealed carry version and a square butt holster or target version of the same gun usually meant having two different frame shapes. The GP100 series, instead, used a small rectangular "peg" grip large enough to enclose the hammer spring and strut. The grips could then be any shape desired, as long as they were large enough to enclose the peg. This was not a new innovation, having been used by Dan Wesson and some High Standard revolvers that predated the GP100. The Dan Wesson patent was granted in 1972 and Ruger's patent was granted in 1986.

The stock grips are made of Santoprene, a soft, chemical resistant elastomer that helps absorb the recoil of firing. Panels on the side, made of black plastic, goncalo alves wood, or rosewood, provide contrast to the flat black of the Santoprene. The grips are now Hogue one piece rubber grips standard.

The GP100 shares the crane lock from the Redhawk that was later used in the small frame SP101 revolver. All of these models use the same thickness on the solid frame and double latching system as used on the heavy .44 Magnum. Because of these features, the GP100 series is widely described as one of the strongest medium frame revolvers ever made.

The GP100 is manufactured in .327 Federal Magnum, .357 Magnum, .38 Special, .22 Long Rifle, .44 Special, and 10mm Auto calibers. Blued steel or stainless steel finishes are available, with stainless model numbers preceded by a "K". The firing pin of the GP100 is mounted inside the frame. The transfer bar of the GP100 is connected directly to the trigger. The transfer bar must be present between the hammer and the firing pin in order for the cartridge to be fired. The transfer bar only assumes the required position when the trigger is pulled completely rearward. GP100 models are available with fixed or adjustable sights. Fixed sight models are designated by a "F" suffix model number. When the cylinder is closed and the gun is at the point of firing, the cylinder crane is locked into the frame at the front and rear of the crane and by the cylinder lock at the bottom of the crane opening. The GP100 disassembles into three major modules with only limited use of tools. This allows the user to easily clean the revolver after shooting. The design of the gun eliminates the need for a frame "sideplate", a feature which contributes to the GP100's reputation for strength.

Specifications

 Weight: Variable, dependent on barrel and shroud length
 Action: The GP100 may be fired by either cocking the hammer and subsequently pulling the trigger (a.k.a. Single Action), or by merely pulling the trigger when the hammer is not cocked (a.k.a. Double Action).
 Maximum effective range: , depending on barrel length, cartridge load, and additional optical sights
 5-Shot: .44 Special
 6-Shot: .357 Magnum, .38 Special, and 10mm Auto
 7-Shot: .357 Magnum and .327 Federal Magnum
 10-Shot: .22 Long Rifle

Models

Special editions
In 2016, a limited edition National Rifle Association variant of the GP100 was available from the Friends of NRA through a fundraising raffle. The guns were all stainless, chambered in .357 Magnum, had 4 inch barrels, serial numbers with "NRA" prefixes, and rosewood grip inserts engraved with "NRA". Only 1,145 were produced.

In 2021, Ruger produced 500 GP100s in memory of Jeff Quinn, a YouTuber and founder of the online firearms magazine Gunblast, who died the previous year.

Users
 : EKAM counter-terrorist unit of the Hellenic Police
 : Special Anti-Terrorist Unit
 : Royal Ulster Constabulary officers were issued the 2.75-inch model chambered in .357 magnum until the adoption of 9mm Glock 17 and 19 pistols.
 : Used by some NYPD officers. The .357 magnum, 4-inch barreled model was issued by the United States Border Patrol to its patrol agents as well as to the uniformed officers of the former U.S. Immigration and Naturalization Service up until the early 1990s and used until both agencies switched to .40 caliber semi-automatic pistols. Also issued to armed prison guards.

Gallery

References

Further reading

External links

Ruger's GP100 page
Ruger-produced Dissembly video
Ruger-produced Cleaning video
Ruger-produced Reassembly video
Ruger’s .357 GP-100 Revolver Considered a Modern Classic, Gun Week, by Jim Williamson

Ruger revolvers
.327 Federal Magnum firearms
.357 Magnum firearms
.22 LR revolvers
Police weapons
Weapons and ammunition introduced in 1985